The Woman's Progressive Club is a historic meeting hall at the southwest corner of Rowena Street and Merriman Avenue in Wynne, Arkansas.  It is a single story brick structure, with a gable-on-hip roof.  It was built in the 1930s with funding from the Works Progress Administration, and is a relatively ornate example of Colonial Revival architecture.  The hall, whose interior largely consists of an auditorium with stage, was built for Cross County's oldest social organization, the Woman's Progressive Club, which was founded in 1913.  The hall has long been a local venue for public, private, and civic events, and is the finest performance space in the city.

The building was listed on the National Register of Historic Places in 1990.

See also
National Register of Historic Places listings in Cross County, Arkansas

References

Clubhouses on the National Register of Historic Places in Arkansas
Colonial Revival architecture in Arkansas
Buildings and structures completed in 1935
Buildings and structures in Cross County, Arkansas
National Register of Historic Places in Cross County, Arkansas